Ulidia Integrated College is situated in Carrickfergus, Northern Ireland. It was opened in 1997 with an initial 63 students. It is the 44th integrated school to be created in the province and provides education for over 530 Catholic and Protestant children.

Context
Integrated Education is a Northern Ireland phenomenon, where traditionally schools were sectarian, either run as Catholic schools or Protestant schools. On as parental request, a school could apply to 'transition' to become Grant Maintained offering 30% of the school places to students from the minority community. Lagan College was the first integrated school to open in 1981.

Under the Education Reform Order (NI), 1989 a school wishing to obtain Grant Maintained Integrated status must convince the Department of Education that it can draw a minimum of 30% of its population from the minority tradition of the area it wishes to serve.

Mission statement
Educating together, Catholics and Protestants, and those of other religions, or none, in an atmosphere of tolerance and understanding, to the highest possible academic standards.

See also
Carrickfergus Learning Community
List of integrated schools in Northern Ireland
List of secondary schools in Northern Ireland

References

External links
Ulidia Integrated College website

Educational institutions established in 1997
Integrated schools in County Antrim
Secondary schools in County Antrim
Carrickfergus
1997 establishments in Northern Ireland